Antonio Iturrioz is a Cuban born American classical pianist. He is a noted performer, documentarian and a piano teacher.

Early life
Antonio was born in Cuba in the town of Havana. His teachers include his father Pablo Iturrioz, Francisco de Hoyos, Bernardo Segall (who was  a pupil of Siloti), Aube Tzerko and Julian White.  He has taken many master classes with Andre Watts, Alexis Weissenberg, Byron Janis and Jorge Bolet.

Musical style and discography
Antonio gave his first performance at age 9 and his orchestral debut at age 15. After an injury to his right hand in his early years, he took 3 years to recover when he studied the complete left hand transcriptions and original compositions of Leopold Godowsky.  Antonio's first documentary  “The Art of the Left Hand: A Brief History of Left Hand Piano Music”, was the result of his many years of studying the left hand piano repertoire and Godowsky was the central figure. In 2010 Antonio created a documentary called "The Buddha of the Piano - Leopold Godowsky" based on his research into the composers life and music. The documentary has been shown on public television across the United States. Antonio is a Steinway Artist   Antonio is the Director of the New International Godowsky Society. In September 2018, Antonio released a new album on the Steinway Label named Gottschalk and Cuba, which contains the first ever recording of A Night in the Tropics, Symphony Romantique, with both movements on piano.

Personal life
Antonio is married and lives with his wife in the Russian River Area of Sonoma, California.

References

External links
http://www.theartofthelefthand.com/info.html

Soiree on Cedar Street
Pianist Antonio Iturrioz at Cabrillo College
ALS Festival 2016 Schedule

American classical pianists
Male classical pianists
American male pianists
Living people
Cuban emigrants to the United States
People from Sonoma, California
Classical musicians from California
21st-century classical pianists
21st-century American male musicians
21st-century American pianists
Year of birth missing (living people)